The 1976 AIAW women's basketball tournament was held on March 25–28, 1976.  The host site was Pennsylvania State University in State College, Pennsylvania.  Sixteen teams participated, and Delta State University was crowned national champion at the conclusion of the tournament, for the second straight season.

Tournament bracket

Main bracket

Consolation bracket

See also
 1976 AIAW National Small College Basketball Championship

References

AIAW women's basketball tournament
AIAW
AIAW National Division I Basketball Championship
1976 in sports in Pennsylvania
Women's sports in Pennsylvania